Jason Gonzalez (born September 30, 1973) is an attorney in Tallahassee, Florida.   He is credited with reshaping the Florida Supreme Court while serving as General Counsel to the Governor of Florida.  He was the chief advisor to the Governor on the appointment of four Florida Supreme Court Justices.   He is a founding shareholder with Lawson Huck Gonzalez, PLLC and handles civil and administrative litigation, appeals, and government affairs.

Early life and family
Jason Gonzalez was born in Tallahassee, Florida, the son of Larry Gonzalez (former Secretary of the Florida Department of Professional Regulations and Director of the Florida Commission on Ethics) and Jean Gonzalez.  A seventh generation Floridian, Gonzalez is the great-great-grandson of Captain Manuel A. Gonzalez, who founded the City of Ft. Myers, Florida in 1866, the great-grandson of Florida Pioneer and Explorer Alfonso Fernando Gonzalez and the great-great-great-great-grandson of  Evander Lee, who founded the City of Leesburg, Florida in 1857.
Gonzalez attended the University of Florida, where he graduated cum laude with a bachelor's degree in business administration and a Juris Doctor degree.  He became an attorney and Florida Bar member in 1998.  While in law school, he married his high school sweetheart Sara Hicks Gonzalez.   Jason and Sara are the parents of three boys.

Legal career
Gonzalez practices in the areas of trial, appellate and administrative litigation and represents clients before the Florida Legislature and all State Executive branch agencies as a partner with Shutts & Bowen LLP.  He has served two terms as General Counsel to the Republican Party of Florida, and a term as General Counsel to the Governor of Florida.

General Counsel to the Republican Party of Florida
Gonzalez has served two terms as General Counsel to the Republican Party of Florida, and has attended four Republican National Conventions with the Florida delegation (1988, 2008, 2012 and 2016).

The Deepwater Horizon Litigation
In 2010, immediately following the explosion and sinking of the Deepwater Horizon, the vessel's owner, Transocean Ltd., selected Gonzalez to serve as its lead counsel for litigation and state regulatory matters in the Florida Panhandle. Over a two-year period, Mr. Gonzalez successfully obtained orders dismissing or removing every one of the more than 70 individual and class action lawsuits filed against Transocean in Florida.

Public service

Judicial Nominating Commissions
In 2007 the Florida Governor appointed Gonzalez to the Judicial Nominating Commission for the Florida Supreme Court.  Gonzalez previously served terms as Chairman of the Judicial Nominating Commission for the First District Court of Appeal of Florida and Chairman of the Judicial Nominating Commission for the Second Judicial Circuit of Florida.

General Counsel to the Governor
Jason Gonzalez was appointed General Counsel to the Governor of Florida in 2008.   As General Counsel he was the chief advisor to the Governor on all legal matters and served as the Governor's Chief Ethics Officer and chief advisor on judicial appointments.
In 2008-2009 Gonzalez was the chief advisor to the Governor on the appointments of four Florida Supreme Court Justices. The four appointments marked the first time in Florida history in which a Governor appointed a majority of the Court in less than a year.

Judges and Justices Appointed During Gonzalez's Term as Governor's Counsel

References

Living people
1973 births
Florida lawyers
People from Tallahassee, Florida
Warrington College of Business alumni
Fredric G. Levin College of Law alumni